Magdala (Aramaic: מגדלא, Magdala, meaning "tower"; Hebrew: , Migdal; , al-Majdal) was an ancient Jewish city on the shore of the Sea of Galilee,  north of Tiberias. In the Babylonian Talmud it is known as Magdala Nunayya (Aramaic: מגדלא נוניה, meaning "Tower of the Fishes"), and which some historical geographers think may refer to Tarichaea, literally the place of processing fish. It is believed to be the birthplace of Mary Magdalene. Until the 1948 Arab–Israeli War, a small Palestinian Arab village, al-Majdal, stood at the site of ancient Magdala, while nowadays the modern Israeli municipality of Migdal extends to the area.

Archaeological excavations on behalf of the Israel Antiquities Authority (IAA) conducted in 2006 found that the settlement began during the Hellenistic period (between the second and first centuries BCE) and ended during the late Roman period (third century CE). Later excavations in 2009–2013 brought perhaps the most important discovery in the site: an ancient synagogue, called the "Migdal Synagogue", dating from the Second Temple period. It is the oldest synagogue found in the Galilee, and one of the only synagogues from that period found in the entire country, as of the time of the excavation. They also found the Magdala stone, which has a seven-branched menorah symbol carved on it. It is the earliest menorah of that period to be discovered outside of Jerusalem. 

As archaeologists continued to dig, they discovered an entire first century Jewish town lying just below the surface. The excavation revealed multiple structures and four mikvaot (plural of mikvah or mikveh). In 2021, another synagogue from the same period was discovered at Magdala.

A collapse layer from the Second Temple period supported the narrative presented by Josephus regarding the Roman destruction of Magdala during the First Jewish–Roman War. Excavations show that after the destruction, during the Byzantine and Early Islamic periods, the city moved slightly to the north.

History

Roman period 
Gustaf Dalman writes of Magdala that, "it was the most important city on the western bank of the lake, contributing a wagon-load of taxes [...] until Herod Antipas raised up a rival on the lake by building Tiberias." Magdala is also described as "the capital of a toparchy", and is compared to Sepphoris and Tiberias in that it had "administrative apparatus and personnel" though not to the same extent.

Synagogues 

The remains of a Roman-period synagogue dated to between 50 BCE and 100 CE were discovered in 2009. The walls of the  main hall were decorated with brightly colored frescoes, and inside there was a stone block carved with a seven-branched menorah.

In December 2021, a second synagogue dating to the Second Temple period was unearthed at Magdala. It is the first time two synagogues from this period have been found in a single site. The second synagogue found was not as ornate as the first, and probably served the city's industrial zone.

Byzantine period 
Recognition of Magdala as the birthplace of Mary Magdalene appears in texts dating back to the 6th century CE.

Early Muslim period 
In the 8th and 10th centuries CE, Christian sources write of a church in the village that was also Mary Magdalene's house, where Jesus is said to have exorcised her of demons. The anonymously penned Life of Constantine attributes the building of the church to Empress Helena in the 4th century CE, at the location where she found Mary Magdalene's house.

Crusader period 
Christian pilgrims to Palestine in the 12th century mention the location of Magdala, but fail to mention the presence of any church.

Mamluk period 

Under the rule of the Mamluks in the 13th century, sources indicate that the church was not destroyed, but was transformed into a stable. In 1283, Burchard of Mount Sion records having entered the house of Mary Magdalene in the village, and about ten years later, Ricoldus of Montecroce noted his joy at having found the church and house still standing.

Mary Magdalene 
All four gospels refer to a follower of Jesus called Mary Magdalene, which is usually assumed to mean "Mary from Magdala", although there is no biblical information to indicate whether it was her birthplace or her home. Most Christian scholars assume that she was from Magdala Nunayya, which is possibly where Jesus landed on the occasion recorded in Matthew 15:39.

Identification 

Matthew's "Magdala" or "Magadan" 
The New Testament makes one disputable mention of a place called Magdala. Matthew 15:39 of the King James Version reads, "And he sent away the multitude, and took ship, and came into the coasts of Magdala". However, some Greek manuscripts give the name of the place as "Magadan", and more recent translations (such as the Revised Version) follow this. Although some commentators state confidently that the two refer to the same place, others dismiss the substitution of Magdala for Magadan as simply "to substitute a known for an unknown place".

Mark's "Dalmanutha" 
The parallel passage in Mark's gospel (Mark 8:10) gives (in the majority of manuscripts) a quite different place name, Dalmanutha, although a handful of manuscripts give either Magdala or Magadan, presumably by assimilation to the Matthean text—believed in ancient times to be older than that of Mark, though this opinion has now been reversed.

The Talmud's two Magdalas 
The Jewish Talmud distinguishes between two Magdalas only:

 Magdala Gadar—One Magdala was in the east, on the River Yarmouk near Gadara (in the Middle Ages "Jadar", now Umm Qais), thus acquiring the name Magdala Gadar.
 Magdala Nunayya—There was another, better-known Magdala near Tiberias, Magdala Nunayya ("Magdala of the fishes"), which would locate it on the shore of the Sea of Galilee. Al-Majdal, a Palestinian Arab village depopulated in the lead up to the 1948 Arab-Israeli war, was identified as the site of this Magdala. The modern Israeli municipality of Migdal, founded in 1910 and about 6 km NNW of Tiberias, has expanded into the area of the former village.

Josephus's "Tarichaea" 
Some researchers think that Josephus refers to Magdala Nunayya by the Greek name Tarichaea, derived from the Greek Τάριχος or tarichos, meaning 'fish preserved by salting or drying', although the matter remains disputed.

Excavations 
Between 1971 and 1977 Magdala was partially excavated by Virgilio Canio Corbo and Stanislao Loffreda of the Studium Biblicum Franciscanum in Jerusalem. However, their reports are in Italian and attracted little notice.

Excavations at Magdala during 2007-8 were called The Magdala Project.

As of 2021, salvage excavations are conducted at Magdala by Y.G. Contractual Archeology Ltd. and under the auspices of The Zinman Institute of Archaeology at the University of Haifa.

See also 
 Dalmanutha, related biblical location
 Tarichaea, related historical location

References

Further reading 
 Achtermeier, P. J. (Ed.) (1996). The Harper Collins Bible Dictionary. San Francisco: HarperCollins.
 Horton, R. F. (1907). A devotional commentary on St. Matthew. London: National Council of the Evangelical Free Churches.
 Jones, I. H. (1994). St Matthew. London: Epworth Press.
 Throckmorton, B. H. (1992). Gospel parallels, 5th edn. Nashville TN: Thomas Nelson.

External links 

 Catholic Encyclopedia—Magdala, the two possible locations mentioned in the Talmud Carmelle Grace Cabaron
 Major New Excavation Planned for Mary Magdalene’s Hometown, 2007
 Ancient Magdala in Israel

Ancient villages in Israel
Ancient synagogues in the Land of Israel
Archaeological sites in Israel
New Testament places
New Testament Aramaic words and phrases
Talmud places
Ancient Jewish settlements of Galilee
60s disestablishments in the Roman Empire
Sea of Galilee